Primavera Esporte Clube, commonly known as Primavera, is a Brazilian football club based in Primavera do Leste, Mato Grosso state.

History
The club was founded on May 13, 2006. They were promoted to the 2011 Campeonato Mato-Grossense First Level because Araguaia, champions of the 2010 Campeonato Mato-Grossense Second Level was not able to compete due to financial problems.

Stadium
Primavera Esporte Clube play their home games at Estádio Municipal Antônio Santo Renosto, nicknamed Cerradão. The stadium has a maximum capacity of 4,000 people.

References

Association football clubs established in 2006
Football clubs in Mato Grosso
2006 establishments in Brazil